Kirovske Raion, known by Ukrainian authorities as the İslâm Terek Rayon is one of the 25 regions of Crimea, currently subject to a territorial dispute between the Russian Federation and Ukraine. The raion's administrative centre is the urban-type settlement of Kirovske. Population: 

The raion is located in the eastern part of the republic. The southern part of the raion is occupied with the foothills, while the northern one is situated in the Crimean steppe. The North-Crimean channel (the main waterway of northern Crimea supplying the republic with water from the Dnieper river) is going through the region.

The raion is famous for the historical town of Stary Krym.

Notes

References

Raions of Crimea